Białoławka is a river of northeastern Poland with a length of about 2 kilometers. It connects Lake Białoławki with Lake Kocioł, which is connected with Lake Roś by the river Wilkus. It is located between the villages of Kwik and Kociołek Szlachecki. About halfway through its run, it crosses the Orzysz-Pisz route.

Rivers of Poland
Rivers of Warmian-Masurian Voivodeship